Sheilah Lukins is a Canadian writer residing in St. Phillip's, Newfoundland. She writes both non-fiction titles and books for children. The first book in her children's series, Full Speed Ahead: Errol's Bell Island Adventure, won the Bruneau Family Children's/Young Adult Award, which is a part of the Newfoundland and Labrador Book Awards. The second book in the series, Flying Ace: Errol's Gander Adventure, won a Canada Book Award. Along with writing, she works at the Memorial University Library.

Works

Non-fiction 

 For Maids Who Brew and Bake: Rare and Excellent Recipes from 17th Century Newfoundland (2003)
 Rain, Drizzle, and Fog: Newfoundland Weather Stories
 Bottom's Up, A History of Alcohol in Newfoundland and Labrador (2020)

Children's books 

 Full Speed Ahead: Errol's Bell Island Adventure (2016)
 Flying Ace: Errol's Gander Adventure (2019)
 Once upon an Iceberg: Errol's Twillingate Adventure (2020)

Awards 

 Canada Book Award for Flying Ace: Errol's Gander Adventure
 Bruneau Family Children's/Young Adult Award for Full Speed Ahead: Errol's Bell Island Adventure
 Gourmand Award for Drink History for Bottom's Up, A History of Alcohol in Newfoundland and Labrador

References 

Living people
Writers from Newfoundland and Labrador
Year of birth missing (living people)